McPherson USD 418 is a public unified school district headquartered in McPherson, Kansas, United States.  The district includes the communities of McPherson, Conway, New Gottland, and nearby rural areas.

Schools
The school district operates the following schools:
 McPherson High School
 McPherson Middle School
 Eisenhower Elementary
 Lincoln Elementary
 Roosevelt Elementary
 Washington Elementary

See also
 List of high schools in Kansas
 List of unified school districts in Kansas
 Kansas State Department of Education
 Kansas State High School Activities Association

References

External links
 

School districts in Kansas
Education in McPherson County, Kansas